Strandherd Station is a transit station in Ottawa, Ontario. It opened on January 2, 2007 and contains a park and ride facility with over 300 parking spaces available. It is located northeast of the intersection of Strandherd Drive and the access to the Riocan Marketplace shopping area, where Barrhaven Centre Station and Marketplace Station opened in mid-2012. This is part of OC Transpo's plans to extend its southwest transitway to its suburb areas.

Route 95 was extended to Strandherd Station when the facility opened. The park and ride lot provides additional spaces for south end residents in Barrhaven, Heart's Desire, Davidson Heights and Manotick. Special routes 406 and 456 also serve the station.

Service was improved in 2012, when the new right-of-way (running through a field parallel to Greenbank Road) was finished, and buses now travel without having to stop for traffic signals or getting caught in traffic on Greenbank Road.

Service

The following routes serve Strandherd station as of October 6, 2019:

See also

 OC Transpo
 Ottawa Rapid Transit
 OC Transpo Route 95
 OC Transpo Routes
 Barrhaven
 Nepean, Ontario
 Ottawa

References

External links
 Strandherd Station page
 Strandherd Area Map

2007 establishments in Ontario
Transitway (Ottawa) stations